Tai Po Road is the second longest road in Hong Kong (after Castle Peak Road). It spans from Sham Shui Po in Kowloon to Tai Po in the New Territories of Hong Kong. Initially, the road was named Frontier Road.

Location
The road begins at Nathan Road near Sham Shui Po, runs through the valley between Golden Hill and Beacon Hill, and connects to Sha Tin. It then continues northward along Sha Tin Hoi and Tai Po Hoi.

History
Built in 1902, Tai Po Road is one of the earliest major roads in the New Territories. Until the completion of the Lion Rock Tunnel in 1967, Tai Po Road was the main road connecting the New Territories with Kowloon. Before the construction of the Fanling Highway in the 1980s, the road connected Fanling and Sheung Shui.

On 10 February 2018, at approximately 18:13 HKT, a Kowloon Motor Bus (KMB) double-decker bus flipped onto its side on Tai Po Road. The crash killed 19 people and injured 65.

The incident was Hong Kong's second deadliest road traffic accident, behind a 2003 incident on Tuen Mun Road that killed 21.

Gallery

See also
 2018 Hong Kong bus accident
 List of streets and roads in Hong Kong
 Castle Peak Road
 Mang Gui Kiu
 North Kowloon Magistracy, located at No. 292 Tai Po Road

References

External links

Google Maps of Tai Po Road:
All sections except Tai Wo (大窩段)
Tai Wo section (大窩段)

Route 9 (Hong Kong)
Sham Shui Po
So Uk
Tai Wai
Sha Tin
Fo Tan
Ma Liu Shui
Pak Shek Kok
Tai Po
Fanling
Sheung Shui
Roads in New Kowloon
Roads in the New Territories